Evgenia Valeryevna Smolyaninova (born 29 February 1964 in Novokuznetsk) is a Russian singer, performer of Russian romance and Folk songs and composer.

Evgenia Smolyaninova was born in a family of teachers in the city of Novokuznetsk; then the family moved to Kemerovo. She studied at music school in Leningrad at the piano department. She made her first appearance as a singer in 1982 in the theater of Slava Polunin in the play "Pictures at an Exhibition" on the music by Mussorgsky.

Her songs and music appear in twelve Russian movies, including short animated film Rusalka by Aleksandr Petrov. She produced sixteen music albums, mostly with Russian romance on music and poetry of 19th and 20th centuries and folk songs. She is a Meritorious Artist of the Russian Federation.

References

Links
smoljaninova.ru — official site
Е.Смольянинова on RussianVoice
YouTube channel
VK account
Facebook account
Her songs on Russian renaissance site
Her site on Laminor TV
Her filmography on Kinopoisk website

Russian folk singers
Russian singer-songwriters
Living people
1964 births
Russian women singer-songwriters
Soviet women singer-songwriters
Soviet singer-songwriters
20th-century Russian women singers
20th-century Russian singers